Achacha is a town and commune in Mostaganem Province, northwestern Algeria. It is the capital of Achacha District. According to the 1998 census it has a population of 31,360. The town is one of four other known towns within Achacha District, Khadra, Nekmaria and Ouled Boughalem.

References

Communes of Mostaganem Province